Ian Herbert White (born November 22, 1949) is an Australian business executive currently based in Canada with the Canadian Wheat Board.

The early years 
White was born to parents Alfred and Noelene White and sister Janelle. He grew up in the inner western suburbs of Sydney and attended Homebush Boys High School. He then went on to study Economics at University of Sydney with Honours. It was during his time at University of Sydney that he met Joan Allen whom he later married.

Career 
His career started in the Federal Government of Australia's Beurau of Statistics, Australian Grants Commission, and Department of Transpoprt in the 1970s. He and his wife developed an interest in farming and lived on a small property named Willsfield out of Canberra. In the late 70's they moved to Queensland and owned a number of small businesses. In the early 1980s they moved to a grain farm on the Darling Downs in Queensland with their business partners. It was at this time that he embarked on his corporate career. Initially employed by Elders Grain Ltd in Australia and Canada (1985–1989),he joined the Saskatchewan Wheat Pool as CEO of AgPro Grain (1989–1991) and Grainco Australia as their first CEO (1991–1996). He has since been CEO or Managing Director for Defiance Mills Ltd (1996–1998), Queensland Cotton USA Operations (1998–2000), Queensland Sugar (2000–2008). In 2008 he and his wife returned to Canada taking the role of the President of the Canadian Wheat Board in Winnipeg, Manitoba. He holds a bachelor of Economics ( Hons )degree from Sydney University, is a member of the Australian Society of CPA's, a Fellow of the Australian Institute of Company Directors, and a member of the Canadian Director's College.

Family life 
Ian and wife Joan were married on December 31, 1971. They have three adult children Clare, Scott and Louise.

References

External links
http://www.cbr.ca/PersonProfile.aspx?PersonID=118861

1949 births
Living people
Australian businesspeople
University of Sydney alumni
Fellows of the Australian Institute of Company Directors